Events from the year 1986 in the United Kingdom. It is particularly noted for the "Big Bang" deregulation of the financial markets.

Incumbents
 Monarch – Elizabeth II
 Prime Minister – Margaret Thatcher (Conservative)
 Parliament – 49th

Events

January
January – The Vauxhall Belmont compact saloon goes on sale, giving buyers a traditional saloon alternative to the Astra hatchback and estate models. The car would remain in production until September 1991.
7 January – The Society of Motor Manufacturers and Traders announces that a record of more than 1.8 million new cars were sold in Britain during 1985, beating the previous record set in 1983. The Ford Escort was Britain's most popular new car for the fourth year running and all of the top 10 best-selling new cars were produced by Ford, Vauxhall or Austin Rover. Continental and Japanese manufacturers enjoyed a good-sized percentage of the new car market though, with Fiat, Nissan, Peugeot, Renault, Volkswagen and Volvo all doing well.
9 January
Michael Heseltine resigns as Defence Secretary over the Westland affair.
After three successive monthly falls in unemployment, the jobless count for December 1985 increased by nearly 15,000 to 3,181,300.
12 January – The game show Catchphrase begins on ITV hosted by Roy Walker along with the computer generated character Mr. Chips. It concludes in 2002, but is revived in 2013.
14 January – The Salafi jihadist group al-Muhajiroun begins to operate in the UK.
20 January – The United Kingdom and France announce plans to construct the Channel Tunnel, which they hope to open by the early-1990s.
24 January – Leon Brittan resigns as Trade and Industry Secretary over the Westland affair.
31 January – Unemployment for this month has increased to 3,204,900 – a postwar high which accounts for 14.4% of the workforce.

February
 February 
Heavy snow and sub-zero temperatures affected most of Britain during the month. 
The British-built Peugeot 309 goes on sale in Britain, four months after its continental launch. It is built at the former Rootes/Chrysler factory at Ryton, near Coventry which is also set to produce a larger Peugeot saloon model from next year.
6 February – The UK Government scraps plans to sell Austin Rover to Ford.
12 February – The Franco-British Channel Fixed Link Treaty is signed at Canterbury as the Channel Tunnel plans move forward.
15 February – In the Wapping dispute, fifty-eight people are arrested by police at a demonstration.
17 February – The UK signs the Single European Act.

March
March – Ford launches a new generation of its big-selling Escort and Orion ranges. 
4 March – The national tabloid newspaper Today launches from Wapping. It pioneers the use of computer photo typesetting and full-colour offset printing at a time when British national newspapers are still using Linotype machines and letterpress.
5 March – The High Court disqualifies and fines 81 Labour councillors for failing to set a rate.
13 March – The Sun newspaper alleges that comedian Freddie Starr ate a live hamster.
18 March – Inheritance tax replaces Capital Transfer Tax.
19 March – Buckingham Palace announces the engagement of Prince Andrew to Sarah Ferguson; they will be married later this year.
23 March – Chelsea F.C. are the first winners of the Football League's new Full Members Cup, beating Manchester City 5–4 in the final at Wembley, although Manchester City clawed the deficit to a single goal in the last five minutes after being 5–1 down.
29 March – The first high-speed catamaran ferry is introduced into service in the British Isles, HSC Our Lady Patricia on Sealink British Ferries' Portsmouth–Ryde passage.
31 March
 The Greater London Council is abolished, as are the metropolitan county councils of West Midlands, Greater Manchester, Merseyside, Tyne and Wear, West Yorkshire and South Yorkshire.
 A fire causes extensive damage at Hampton Court Palace in Surrey.
 The Haig Pit, Whitehaven, Cumbria closes.

April
April – Hanson Trust concludes its takeover of the Imperial Group for £2.5 billion.
1 April – The Prince and Princess of Wales (Charles and Diana) open the extension of London Underground's Piccadilly line to Heathrow Terminal 4. Trains do not stop at the station until 12 April.
7 April – Clive Sinclair sells rights to ZX Spectrum and other inventions to Amstrad.
15 April – The Shops Bill 1986, which would have liberalised Sunday shopping, is defeated in the House of Commons on its second reading, the last time that a government bill will fall at that stage, one of only four defeats in the Commons for Mrs Thatcher and the only time an entire government bill is defeated during her tenure.
17 April
 Journalist John McCarthy is kidnapped in Beirut, where three other hostages are found dead. The Revolutionary Cells (RZ) claims responsibility as revenge for the recent American bombing of Libya.
 A treaty is signed to end the supposed Three Hundred and Thirty Five Years' War between the Netherlands and the Isles of Scilly.
20 April – Oxford United F.C., who joined the Football League only in 1962 and are in the First Division for the first time, win the Football League Cup with a 3–0 win over Queens Park Rangers at Wembley.
24 April – Wallis, Duchess of Windsor dies in her home in the Bois de Boulogne, Paris, aged 89, outliving her husband by fourteen years.
28 April – The first phase of the MetroCentre, Europe's largest indoor shopping centre, in Gateshead, is opened. The remainder of the centre is set to open this autumn.
29 April – The Duchess of Windsor is buried at Frogmore.
30 April – Rioting erupts overnight in prisons across Britain. Dozens of prisoners escape, while prisoners at Stafford Prison set the prison canteen alight by smashing windows and dumping a burning mattress onto the roof. The worst disturbances come at Northeye Prison in Sussex, where a 70-strong mob of prisoners takes over the jail and sets fire to the canteen, hospital wing and sports hall.

May
May – The last Talbot badged passenger cars are built in Britain and France by Peugeot who will continue making their own cars at the former Rootes Group plant near Coventry and the former Simca production facilities in France. Peugeot is to continue the Talbot brand for commercial vehicles and production of the Horizon range will continue in Spain and Finland until next year. 
5 May – Liverpool win the Football League First Division title for a record 16th time after winning 1–0 at Chelsea. Kenny Dalglish, in his first season as the club's player-manager, scores the goal which gives Liverpool the title.
8 May – Labour makes large gains in local council elections, collecting 37% of the votes nationally compared to the Conservatives on 34% and the Alliance on 26%. These are the first national elections to be held since the recent abolition of the metropolitan councils.
10 May – The first all-Merseyside FA Cup final ends in a 3–1 win for Liverpool over Everton, who become only the third team this century to win the double, having already secured the Football League First Division title.
20 May – The Marriage (Prohibited Degrees of Relationship) Act revises the prohibited degree of kinship for marriage.
21 May – The Harrison Birtwistle opera The Mask of Orpheus premieres in London.

June
10 June – Patrick Joseph Magee is found guilty of the 1984 Brighton hotel bombing and sentenced to life imprisonment.
12 June
 Derek Hatton, leader of Liverpool council, is expelled from the Labour Party for belonging to the entryist Militant group.
 Austin Rover is renamed the Rover Group four years after the name change from British Leyland.
14 June – The Queen rides to Trooping the Colour on horseback for the last time.
23 June – Patrick Magee is jailed for life for the Brighton bombing of October 1984 as well as other IRA bombings.
24 June – Ian Paisley's Democratic Unionist Party stage protest at dissolution of Northern Ireland Assembly.
29 June
 Richard Branson beats the speed record for a transatlantic crossing by boat in Virgin Atlantic Challenger II but is denied the Blue Riband award.
 The World Cup ends in Mexico with Argentina as winners and West Germany runners-up, but England's Gary Lineker wins the Golden Boot, having finished as the competition's leading scorer with six goals. Lineker, who has been at Everton for the last year and is the First Division's top scorer, is reported to be on the verge of a transfer to FC Barcelona of Spain.

July
 July – Nissan begins production of the Bluebird at its landmark factory near Sunderland.
1 July – Gary Lineker becomes the most expensive British footballer ever in a £2.75 million move from Everton to FC Barcelona.
2 July – 24 hours after Gary Lineker's transfer, Ian Rush sets a new transfer record for a British footballer when he agrees a £3.2 million move from Liverpool to Juventus of Italy, but is loaned back to Liverpool for a season and will not play his first game for Juventus until at least August 1987.
4 July – A policeman is cleared of the manslaughter of five-year-old John Shorthouse, who was killed in an armed raid on a house in Birmingham in August last year.
10 July – Austin Rover launches its new Honda-based Rover 800 executive car, which replaces the decade-old Rover SD1 and is part of a joint venture with Japanese carmaker Honda. The car will also be sold in the United States under the Sterling marque. The Honda version will be badged as the Honda Legend.
12 July – Rioting breaks out at Portadown in Northern Ireland between Protestants and Catholics.
17 July – It is announced that unemployment rose to 3,220,400 in June. It has now exceeded 3 million for nearly five years.
23 July – Prince Andrew, Duke of York, marries Sarah Ferguson at Westminster Abbey in London.
24 July – 2 August – The Commonwealth Games are held in Edinburgh.
28 July – Estate agent Suzy Lamplugh vanishes after a meeting in London. She was declared legally dead in 1994, but as of 2020, her body has still not been found and the case remains unsolved to the present day.
30 July – A MORI poll shows that Labour are now nine points ahead of the Conservatives with 41% of the vote, with Liberal/SDP Alliance support now at 25%.

August
8 August – Rival gangs of Manchester United and West Ham United fans clash on a Sealink ferry bound for Amsterdam where the two clubs are playing pre-season friendlies. The UEFA ban on English clubs in European competitions is continuing for a second season, and there are now fears that English clubs may not even be able to play friendlies overseas.
13 August – The Eurotunnel Group is formed to operate the Channel Tunnel.
15 August – The latest MORI poll shows that the Conservatives have eliminated Labour's nine-point lead and drawn level with them by gaining 37% in the latest opinion poll, in the space of just over two weeks.
16 August – Figures released by the government reveal that a record of nearly 3,100,000 people claimed Unemployment Benefit last month, although the official total of unemployed people in Britain is still short of the record of nearly 3,300,000 which was set two years ago.
19 August – The privatisation of the National Bus Company begins with the first sale of a bus operating subsidiary, Devon General, in a management buyout.
22 August – John Stalker, deputy chief constable of Greater Manchester police, is cleared of misconduct over allegations of associating with criminals.
25 August – Economists warn that a global recession is imminent, barely five years after the previous recession.
29 August
Britain's oldest twins, May and Marjorie Chavasse, celebrate their one-hundredth birthday.
Highest national average 24-hour total rainfall until 2020.
c. August – The one-millionth council house in the United Kingdom is sold to its tenants in Scotland, seven years after the Right To Buy scheme was launched.

September
September – GCSE examination courses replace both GCE 'O' Level and CSE courses for 14-year-olds.
6 September – First episode of medical drama serial Casualty airs on BBC One. It will still be running on television more than thirty years later.
8 September – Margaret Thatcher officially opens the first phase of the Nissan car factory at Sunderland, which has been in use for two months. It is the first car factory to be built in Europe by a Japanese carmaker.
14 September – Fears of another recession in Britain are eased by economists at Liverpool University predicting 3.1% economic growth next year.
18 September – It is announced that unemployment rose to 3,280,106 in July.
19 September – A man is killed in the Colwich rail crash.
24 September – The flotation of the Trustee Savings Banks attracts a record of more than 4 million applications for shares.

October
7 October – The first edition of The Independent national morning newspaper is published in London.
9 October
"Babes in the Wood" murders: two girls, Nicola Fellows (aged nine) and Karen Hadaway (aged 10), are reported missing in Moulsecoomb, Brighton.
Musical The Phantom of the Opera opens at Her Majesty's Theatre in London.
10 October – "Babes in the Wood" murders: two bodies found in Wild Park, Brighton, are identified as those of the two girls reported missing yesterday and a murder investigation is launched; a conviction would not be obtained until 2018.
12 October – Elizabeth II and Prince Philip, Duke of Edinburgh visit the People's Republic of China, the first ever visit to the country by a British monarch.
14 October – The MetroCentre, a shopping complex built on the Tyneside Enterprise Zone, is opened. It is similar in concept to the Merry Hill Shopping Centre that is being developed near Dudley in the West Midlands. The MetroCentre is officially the largest shopping complex in Europe. Among the MetroCentre's tenants is Marks & Spencer, whose department store there is its first out of town outlet.
24 October – The UK breaks off diplomatic relations with Syria over links to the Hindawi Affair.
26 October
Bus deregulation begins in the United Kingdom, except Greater London and Northern Ireland.
Jeffrey Archer resigns as Deputy Chairman of the Conservative Party over allegations concerning prostitutes.
27 October 
"Big Bang Day": London Stock Exchange is computerised, and opens to foreign companies.
The Australian TV soap Neighbours is launched on BBC One, more than a year after debuting in its native country.
28 October – Jeremy Bamber is found guilty of the 1985 "White House Farm murders" of his parents, sister and twin nephews in Essex, and is sentenced to life imprisonment with a recommended minimum of 25 years and as of 2021 will still be in prison.
29 October – Margaret Thatcher opens the completed M25 London Orbital Motorway, the first section of which opened in 1975. It covers a distance of 122 miles and features 31 junctions, although there are no service stations yet.

November
 November
First UNESCO World Heritage Sites in the U.K. designated: Giant's Causeway and the Causeway Coast (Northern Ireland); Durham Castle and Cathedral; Ironbridge Gorge; Studley Royal Park (including the ruins of Fountains Abbey); Stonehenge, Avebury and Associated Sites; and Castles and Town Walls of King Edward in Gwynedd (Wales).
 Launch of the second generation Vauxhall Carlton, largest model in the Vauxhall range. It will be sold as the Opel Omega on the continent, and all European versions of the car will be built in West Germany.
3 November – The Conservatives top a MORI poll for the first time this year, coming one point ahead of Labour with 40% of the vote. Liberal/SDP Alliance support has slumped to 18%.
6 November
 45 people are killed in the 1986 British International Helicopters Chinook crash.
 Chancellor Nigel Lawson announces a £4.6 billion rise in public spending.
 Alex Ferguson is appointed manager of Manchester United football club following the dismissal of Ron Atkinson after more than five years in charge. United won two FA Cups under the management of Atkinson but have not won the league title since 1967 and are now second from bottom in the Football League First Division.
7 November – Sir James Goldsmith's £5 billion bid for the Goodyear Tire and Rubber Company is rejected.
13 November – It is announced that unemployment fell by 96,000 in October.
18 November – Ian Brady and Myra Hindley, who are both still in prison 20 years after their Moors Murders convictions, confess to the murders of two missing children - Pauline Reade, who vanished in July 1963 at the age of 16, and Keith Bennett, who was last seen in June 1964 at the age of 12.
20 November – Greater Manchester Police begin their search for the two newly identified Moors Murders victims.
21 November – The Government launches a £20 million campaign to warn members of the public about the dangers of AIDS.

December
December – The first case of bovine spongiform encephalopathy is diagnosed in British cattle.
1 December – The government launches an inquiry into financial irregularities at Guinness.
3 December – 4 million people apply for shares in British Gas in anticipation of flotation next week.
4 December – 20-year-old roofer Russell Bishop is charged with the "Babes in the Wood" murders in Brighton two months ago but will not be convicted until a second trial in 2018.
8 December – British Gas shares are floated on the Stock Exchange. The initial public offering of 135p per share values the company at £9 billion, the highest equity offering ever at this time.
17 December – The world's first heart, lung and liver transplant is carried out at Papworth Hospital in Cambridgeshire.
18 December – It is announced that unemployment fell to a four-year low of less than 3,100,000 in November. On 15 January 1987 it is announced that unemployment has fallen in December 1986 for the fifth month in succession.
22 December – David Penhaligon, a leading Liberal Party MP, dies in a car crash near Truro in Cornwall at the age of 42.
25 December – The highest audience of all time for a British television drama is attracted by the Christmas Day episode of EastEnders, the BBC 1 soap opera, in which Den Watts (Leslie Grantham) serves the divorce papers on his wife Angie (Anita Dobson) after discovering that she had feigned a terminal illness to try to stop him from leaving her in an episode aired in October this year. More than 30 million viewers tune in for the episode of the TV series which first went on air in February 1985.
29 December – Harold Macmillan, Earl of Stockton and former Prime Minister, dies at the age of 92 at his home, Birch Grove in East Sussex.

Undated
Inflation reaches a 19-year low of 3.4%.
Introduction of Family credit, a tax credit for poorer families.
Bank of England withdraws its guidance on mortgage lending.
Establishment of National Museums and Galleries on Merseyside group of institutions, funded through national government.
Mathematician Simon Donaldson wins a Fields Medal.
 Children and young people's counselling charity, Childline, founded.

Publications
Janet and Allan Ahlberg's children's book The Jolly Postman.
Kingsley Amis's novel The Old Devils.
Jeffrey Archer's novel A Matter of Honour.
Iain Banks' novel The Bridge.
John le Carré's novel A Perfect Spy.
Richard Dawkins' book The Blind Watchmaker.
Brian Jacques' children's fantasy novel Redwall, first in the eponymous series.
Terry Pratchett's Discworld novel The Light Fantastic.

Births

January

 1 January
 Anna Brewster, actress and model
 James Cottriall, English-born Austrian singer and musician
 Colin Morgan, actor
 2 January – Rob Beckett, comedian, narrator, and presenter
 3 January – Liam Treadwell, National Hunt jockey (died 2020)
 4 January – James Milner, footballer
 6 January – Alex Turner, musician
 7 January – Liam Fontaine, footballer
 8 January – Emika, electronic musician
 9 January – Craig Davies, footballer
 10 January – Abbey Clancy, model and television personality
 11 January
 Kamara Bacchus, actress and radio personality
 Kelly Chambers, footballer
 Liam Coleman, footballer
 Terry Etim, mixed martial artist
 Rachel Riley, television presenter
 12 January
 Edward Drake, Olympic skier
 Chris Evangelou, actor and boxer
 Kieron Richardson, actor
 13 January – Rosalind Canter, equestrian
 17 January
 Nicholas D. Cooper, actor
 Lucy Evangelista, model and pageant winner
 18 January – John Farnworth, football freestyler, entertainer, actor, and World Record holder
 20 January – Hannah Daniel, actress
 22 January – Ella Edmondson, singer/songwriter
 23 January – Anne Foy, children's television presenter
 24 January
 Mischa Barton, British-born American actress
 Oliver Brennand, rugby player
 Montell Douglas, Olympic sprinter and bobsleigher
 26 January
 Luke Bowen, speedway rider
 Danny Crow, footballer
 28 January
 Jessica Ennis-Hill, Olympic heptathlete
 Ashley Lilley, actress and singer
 29 January – Mark Howard, footballer

February

 1 February
 Kerry Blewett, lifeguard and canoe sprinter
 Joe Connor, footballer
 Tom Deacon, comedian
 2 February – Gemma Arterton, actress
 3 February
 Donald Barrell, rugby player
 James DeGale, boxer
 David Edwards, footballer
 4 February – Lewis Chalmers, footballer
 5 February – Billy Sharp, footballer
 6 February – Jon-Allan Butterworth, Paralympic cyclist
 7 February – Ben Batt, actor
 8 February – James Collins, rugby player
 11 February
 Bim Afolami, politician
 Tom Bartram, cricketer
 Mark Coulson, footballer
 19 February
 Duncan Bradshaw, cricketer
 Ophelia Lovibond, actress
 21 February – Charlotte Church, singer/songwriter
 23 February
 Darren Cheesman, hockey player
 Laura Coleman, model, social media influencer, and actress
 25 February
 Andrew Dick, footballer
 James and Oliver Phelps, identical twin actors
 27 February – Adam Bartlett, footballer
 28 February – Kingsley Ben-Adir, actor

March

 1 March
 Joanna Blair, javelin thrower
 Aaron Bramwell, rugby player
 Alec Utgoff, Ukrainian-born actor
 2 March
 James Ashmore, footballer
 Jay Conroy, footballer
 3 March
 Iwan Brown, rugby player
 Tom Curle, footballer
 5 March – Matty Fryatt, footballer and coach
 6 March
 Danny Jones, rugby league footballer (died 2015)
 Charlie Mulgrew, footballer
 7 March – Geraint Davies, rugby player
 8 March – Emma Cousin, artist
 11 March
 Peter Bissell, cyclist
 Tom Clarke, musician and frontman for The Enemy
 Will Dobson, cricketer
 12 March
 Mat Bailey, footballer
 Danny Jones, musician, singer/songwriter, vocalist and guitarist for McFly
 13 March
 Hannah Claydon, model
 Kat Driscoll, Olympic trampoline gymnast
 14 March – Jamie Bell, actor
 16 March
 Dave Coupland, golfer
 Joe Denly, cricketer
 19 March – Kane Ashcroft, footballer (died 2015)
 20 March – Kirsty Blackman, politician
 21 March
Samantha Bowen, Iraqi War veteran and Paralympic sitting volleyball player
Sam Nixon, singer and TV presenter
 22 March
 Tom Cheeseman, footballer
 Eddie Dennis, wrestler
 24 March
 Tom Davies, rugby player
 25 March
 Ashleigh Ball, hockey player
 Bob Davidson, footballer
 26 March – Luc Bernard, video game designer and artist
 28 March
 Jay Curtis, television & radio broadcaster and actor
 Bolu Fagborun, Nigerian-born rugby player
 29 March – Sylvan Ebanks-Blake, footballer
 31 March
 Scott Baker, darts player
 Matty Collins, footballer

April

 1 April – Fardad Farahzad, Iranian-born journalist
 3 April – Coleen Rooney, Media Personality
 6 April – David Avery, actor
 7 April – Andi Fraggs, singer/songwriter and music producer
 8 April – Liam Scarlett, choreographer (died 2021)
 9 April
 Doctor P, dubstep producer and DJ
 Leilani Franco, contortionist
 10 April
 Sam Attwater, actor
 Adam Connolly, footballer
 Martin Drury, footballer and coach
 12 April – Nick Crumpton, zoologist and children's author
 13 April – Michael Bingham, Olympic track-and-field athlete
 14 April – Matt Derbyshire, footballer
 15 April
 Chris Dagnall, footballer
 Tom Heaton, footballer
 16 April
 Darren Campbell, footballer
 Paul Di Resta, racing driver
 17 April – Brett Ferres, rugby player
 18 April
 Jordan Brookes, comedian
 Gavin Cadwallader, footballer
 James Dabill, motorcycle trials rider
 Gareth Evans, Olympic weightlifter
 21 April – Blair Cowan, rugby player
 22 April – Stuart Anderson, footballer
 23 April – Stuart Fleetwood, footballer
 25 April – Daniel Sharman, actor
 27 April – Jenna Coleman, actress
 29 April – Donna Etiebet, rower
 30 April – Michael Collins, footballer

May

 3 May
 Kell Brook, boxer
 Poppy Delevingne, model
 Jon-Lewis Dickinson, boxer
 5 May – Brett Domino, musician and comedian
 6 May – David Buchanan, footballer
 7 May – Jamie Day, footballer
 10 May – Liam Davies, rugby player
 11 May – Marc Fitzpatrick, footballer
 12 May – Luke Douglas, Australian-born rugby player
 13 May
 Mark Bott, cricketer
 Robert Pattinson, actor
 14 May – Richard Huckle, convicted sex offender (died 2019)
 15 May – Tom Champion, footballer
 16 May – Charlie Fink, songwriter, producer and filmmaker
 17 May – Jodie Taylor, footballer
 19 May – Christian Begg, cricketer
 20 May
 Dexter Blackstock, footballer
 Robert Emms, actor
 23 May – Matthew Crampton, cyclist
 24 May – Charlie Casely-Hayford, fashion designer
 25 May – Lauren Crace, actress and radio presenter
 26 May
 Fern Brady, comedian and writer
 James Cockle, speedway rider
 Martin Paul Eve, academic, writer, and disability rights campaigner
 27 May – Conor Cummins, motorcycle racer
 28 May – Laura Dockrill, author and performance poet
 29 May
 Anthony Barry, footballer
 Danny Fox, footballer
 31 May – Chris Brooker, rugby player

June

 1 June – Skream, DJ and producer
 3 June
 Jordan Crane, rugby player
 Mike Dodds, football coach
 4 June
 Scott Boyd, footballer
 Oona Chaplin, Spanish-born actress and dancer
 Nicole Emmanuel, footballer
 Shelly Woods, Paralympic wheelchair racer
 5 June – Charlotte Dobson, Olympic sailor
 8 June – Michelle Cooper, bowler
 9 June – Luis Felber, British-born Peruvian musician
 10 June – Zara Dampney, Olympic beach volleyball player
 12 June
 Gary Buckland, boxer
 Scott Flinders, footballer
 Luke Youngblood, actor
 13 June – Mark D. Ferguson, film director, screenwriter and camera operator
 14 June – Jonathan Clare, cricketer
 15 June
 Jordan Andrews, composer, musician and producer
 Dean Bowditch, footballer
 17 June
 Steven Davies, cricketer
 Helen Glover, rower
 18 June
 Kevin Bradley, footballer
 Gareth Duke, Paralympic swimmer
 Ian Field, cyclo-cross cyclist
 Richard Madden, actor
 20 June – Alex Davies, rugby player
 21 June – Stuart Abbot, footballer
 23 June – Colin Ryan, actor
 24 June – Stuart Broad, cricketer
 25 June
 Megan Burns, musician and actress
 Sean Crombie, rugby player
 26 June – Paddy Coupar, rugby player
 27 June – Sam Claflin, actor

July

 3 July – Chris Bush, playwright and artistic director
 4 July
 Marvin Bartley, footballer
 Julia Beckett, Olympic swimmer
 10 July
 Tom Richards, squash player
 Scott Westgarth, boxer (died 2018)
 11 July
 Derek Carcary, footballer
 Ian Cathro, football coach
 14 July – Dan Smith, singer
 16 July – James Drury, English-born Virgin Islands footballer
 17 July – William Easton, footballer
 21 July
 Michael Collins, rugby player
 Rebecca Ferguson, soul singer/songwriter
 22 July – Robert Campbell, footballer
 24 July – Alissa Firsova, Russian-born classical composer, pianist, and conductor
 25 July
 Kate Butters, basketball player
 Alan Clyne, squash player
 26 July – Mathew Birley, footballer
 29 July – FuntCase, DJ and dubstep producer
 31 July – Charlie Clemmow, actress

August

 1 August
 Damien Allen, footballer
 Daisy May Cooper, actress and writer
 3 August – Rebekah Cook, motorcycle trials rider
 4 August – Leon Camier, motorcycle racer
 5 August – Jamie Baker, tennis player
 6 August – Nick Brodie, coxswain
 9 August
 Robert Adcock, badminton player
 Aled Brew, rugby player
 10 August – Ross Burkinshaw, boxer
 15 August
 Teddy Sinclair, singer/songwriter
 16 August
 Danny Ayres, speedway racer (died 2020)
 Niki Birrell, Paralympic sailor
 19 August
 Rachael Burford, rugby player
 Zuby, rapper
 20 August
 Grant Anderson, footballer
 Kerry Barr, curler
 Steven Campbell, footballer
 Andrew Surman, footballer
 22 August
 James Frost, guitarist, keyboardist and backing vocalist for The Automatic
 Bobby Cole Norris, television personality
 Benjamin Satterley, wrestler
 24 August
 Jonny Cocker, racing driver
 Jamie Cox, boxer
 27 August – Laura Bates, feminist writer
 28 August
 Stuart Bithell, Olympic sailor
 Paul Crook, rugby player
 Florence Welch, English singer/songwriter
 30 August – Theo Hutchcraft, pop musician

September

 6 September
 Daniel Dillon, footballer
 Phil Doughty, footballer
 7 September
 Charlie Daniels, footballer
 Jodie Turner-Smith, actress and model
 11 September – Adam Dixon, hockey player
 12 September
 Alfie Allen, actor
 Akwasi Fobi-Edusei, footballer
 Dawn Foster, journalist, broadcaster, and author (died 2021)
 13 September – Darren Daniel, rugby player
 14 September
 Paul Brannigan, actor
 Joel Byrom, footballer
 15 September – Jenna McCorkell, figure skater
 16 September – Hasib Hussain, Islamic terrorist, murders 13 people during 7 July 2005 London bombings (suicide 2005)
 17 September 
 Jack Adams, rugby union player (died 2021)
 Rob Elvins, footballer
 Ashley Foyle, footballer
 Sophie, Scottish songwriter and record producer (died 2021)
 18 September
 Cammy Bell, footballer and coach
 Keeley Hazell, model
 22 September
 CASisDEAD, rapper and MC
 Ryan Dicker, footballer
 Steven Findlay, rugby player
 23 September – Lisa Farnell, Canadian-born curler
 25 September – Josh Bateman, rugby player
 26 September – Martin Cranie, footballer
 27 September
 Efe Echanomi, Nigerian-born footballer
 Greg Fleming, footballer
 29 September – Cerith Flinn, actor

October

 1 October
 Paul Edwards, boxer
 Carl Finnigan, footballer
 Danny Francis, footballer
 2 October – Tom Hudson, actor
 3 October
 Alex Ball, cricketer
 Calum Forrester, rugby player
 4 October – Gary Boyd, golfer
 6 October – Michael Eilberg, dressage rider
 8 October
 Louis Dodds, footballer
 George Flanagan, rugby player
 9 October – Sam Ashton, footballer 
 10 October
 Jamie Conlan, boxer
 Matty Dale, rugby player
 Lucy Griffiths, actress
 13 October
 Gabby Agbonlahor, footballer
 Beth Croft, Christian musician
 14 October
 Matt Bulman, footballer
 Tom Craddock, footballer
 15 October – Tommy Forecast, footballer
 16 October – Craig Pickering, sprinter
 17 October – Sam Foley, footballer
 18 October – Aidan Collins, footballer
 19 October – Anthony England, rugby player
 20 October
 Charlie Brown, singer/songwriter
 Charlie Duffell, cricketer
 Ryan Esders, rugby player
 21 October – Keith Barker, cricketer
 22 October
 John Boyle, footballer
 Phil Burleigh, rugby player
 Dale Roberts, footballer (died 2010)
 23 October
 Emilia Clarke, actress
 Lee Costello, motorcycle racer
 24 October
 Will Bragg, cricketer
 John Ruddy, footballer

November

 2 November – Cherrelle Fennell, Olympic gymnast
 3 November – Scott Armstrong, rugby player
 4 November – Seve Benson, golfer
 6 November
 Nick Aldis, wrestler
 Craig Bryson, footballer
 8 November
 Draft, electronic music producer, DJ and songwriter
 Jamie Roberts, rugby player
 10 November – Travis Binnion, English-born Irish footballer and cricketer
 13 November
 Kevin Bridges, stand-up comedian
 Adam Cox, gymnast
 14 November
 Richard Buck, sprinter
 Matt Cook, rugby player
 Ashley Fuller, footballer
 15 November
 Jamie Chestney, bowler
 Jared Hodgkiss, footballer
 16 November
 Anthony Crolla, boxer
 Ayden Duffy, footballer
 17 November
 Matt Barron, rugby player
 Greg Rutherford, Olympic track-and-field athlete
 18 November – Richard Strachan, personal trainer and sprinter
 19 November – Sam Betty, rugby player
 20 November – Oliver Sykes, vocalist and frontman for Bring Me the Horizon
 21 November
 Tom Cahill, footballer
 Sam Palladio, actor and musician
 22 November
 Jack Blumenau, actor
 Paul Dixon, footballer
 23 November – Liam Davis, footballer
 25 November – Louise Alder, lyric soprano
 26 November – Nathan Craze, hockey player
 27 November
 Sammy Dobson, actress
 George Eaton, journalist
 28 November
 Dan Carden, politician
 Helen Wood, TV personality
 29 November – Joe Colbeck, footballer

December

 1 December
 Michael Bakare, footballer
 Natasha O'Keeffe, actress 
 Andrew Tate, internet personality 
 2 December – Adam Le Fondre, footballer
 5 December – Leigh Alderson, ballet dancer
 6 December – Sean Edwards, racing driver (died 2013)
 8 December
 Lara Carroll, English-born Australian Olympic swimmer
 Amir Khan, boxer
 9 December – Dale Appleby, cyclist
 10 December – Matthew Bates, footballer
 11 December
 Gary Carr, actor, dancer, and musician
 Kris Doolan, footballer
 Lee Peltier, footballer
 12 December
 Sean Clohessy, footballer
 Ayden Faal, rugby player
 Jo Fraser, painter
 13 December – Ben Evans, golfer
 14 December
 Phil Boulton, rugby player
 Ryan Dickson, footballer
 18 December
 Eku Edewor, actress, television presenter, and model
 Harry Fry, racehorse trainer
 19 December – Calvin Andrew, footballer
 20 December
 Ian Bibby, cyclist
 Benjamin Brierley, English-born German rugby player
 Chris Cornes, footballer
 23 December – Tom Birchall, motorcycle-with-sidecar racer
 26 December
 Josh Beech, English-born American singer/songwriter
 Nichola Burley, actress
 Emily Fleeshman, actress
 Kit Harrington, actor
 27 December – Liam Craig, footballer
 28 December – Hannah Elsy, rower
 30 December
 Nikki Brammeier, cyclist
 Ellie Goulding, singer
 Faye Marsay, actress

Date Unknown

 Alice Birch, playwright and screenwriter
 Caroline Bird, poet, playwright, and author
 Brian Blackwell, convicted murderer
 Joe Borg, screenwriter
 Millie Brown, performance artist
 Hugh Brunt, music conductor
 Jen Calleja, writer and literary translator
 Poppy Corbett, playwright
 Thomas Crowther, professor of ecology at ETH Zurich and co-chair of the advisory board for the UN Decade on Ecosystem Restoration
 Deckscar, DJ and music producer
 Ryan Edgar, footballer
 Laura Evans, snooker player
 Martin Paul Eve, academic, writer, and disability rights campaigner
 Floating Points, electronic music producer, DJ, and musician
 Katrina Forrester, political theorist and historian
 Danny Fox, artist

Deaths
3 January – Dustin Gee, comedian (born 1942)
4 January
Christopher Isherwood, novelist (born 1904)
Phil Lynott, Irish singer, Thin Lizzy frontman (born 1949)
1 February – Dick James, singer and record producer (born 1920)
10 February – Brian Aherne, actor (born 1902)
14 February – Edmund Rubbra, composer (born 1901)
28 February – Sir Thomas Williams, Labour MP (born 1915)
10 March – Ray Milland, actor (born 1907)
17 March – Sir John Bagot Glubb, general and author, leader of the Arab Legion (1939–1956) (born 1897)
3 April – Peter Pears, tenor (born 1910)
11 April – Lady Penelope Betjeman, travel writer and wife of Sir John Betjeman (born 1910)
23 April – Jim Laker, cricketer (born 1922)
24 April – Wallis, Duchess of Windsor (born 1896) 
1 May – Hylda Baker, actress (born 1905)
8 May – Manny Shinwell, Baron Shinwell, trade union official and Labour MP (born 1884)
3 June – Dame Anna Neagle, actress (born 1904)
23 June
Sir Moses Finley, classical scholar (born 1912 in the United States)
Nigel Stock, actor (born 1919)
25 June – Laurie Fishlock, cricketer and footballer (born 1907)
16 July – Robert Boothby, Baron Boothby, Conservative MP (born 1900)
18 July – Sir Stanley Rous, president of FIFA and former secretary of the Football Association (born 1894)
27 July – Osbert Lancaster, cartoonist (born 1908)
3 August – Beryl Markham, British-born Kenyan pilot and author (born 1902)
31 August  – Henry Moore, sculptor (born 1898)
17 September – Pat Phoenix, actress (born 1923)
5 October 
 Mairin Mitchell, journalist, author and translator (born 1895)
 James H. Wilkinson, mathematician (born 1919)
16 October – Ted Sagar, footballer (born 1910)
28 October
John Braine, novelist (born 1922)
Ian Marter, actor and writer (born 1944)
22 December – David Penhaligon, Liberal MP (car accident) (born 1944)
29 December – Harold Macmillan, former Prime Minister (born 1894)
31 December – Geoffrey John Audley Miles, senior Royal Navy admiral and veteran of both world wars (born 1890)

See also
 1986 in British music
 1986 in British television
 List of British films of 1986

References

 
Years of the 20th century in the United Kingdom
United Kingdom